National Black Police Association may refer to either:

National Black Police Association (United Kingdom)
National Black Police Association (United States)

The term may also refer to:

The Black and Tans